The New Gladiators is a documentary movie by Elvis Presley and Ed Parker centered on the fights of the  United States Karate team in London, England and  Brussels, Belgium.
Narrated by Chuck Sullivan, it was filmed between 1973 and 1974 but finally remastered and later released in 2002.
The movie was financed by American singer and actor Elvis Presley, who began to practice karate during his duty years in the United States Army.

Production
In 1974, George Waite presented the idea of the film to Ed Parker, Presley's karate instructor. In the film, Presley was playing the main role, introducing Karate arts divided in narration and demonstrations.
Parker presented the idea to Presley, who subsequently liked the idea.  There was a meeting organized at Graceland, but no major details were arranged because Presley had to leave for travel to Las Vegas to perform on a show. The next morning Presley called Waite and sent his private plane to fly Waite and his wife to Vegas to complete the meeting. During the show, Presley extended a $50,000 check for beginning the production of the film.
In 1977, after Presley's death, the movie was stored in a garage in West Hollywood inside the bed of a truck, along with other memorabilia objects.
In 2001, the footage was found, restored, and later released on August 17, 2002. On August 16, 2009, Elvis Presley Enterprises released a new version of the film with extra footage of Presley in Karate training sessions.

Sources

See also
 List of American films of 1974

External links
Official Web Site
 

1974 films
2002 films
Films shot in Belgium
Films shot in London
Films about Elvis Presley
American sports documentary films
2000s English-language films
1970s English-language films
1970s American films
2000s American films